This is a list of rivers in Sierra Leone. This list is arranged  by drainage basin, with respective tributaries indented under each larger stream's name.

Atlantic Ocean

Great Scarcies River (Kolenté River)
Little Scarcies River (Kaba River)
Mabole River
Mongo River
Lolo River
Sierra Leone River
Rokel River (Seli River)
Bankasoka River (called Port Loko Creek in the tidal part)
Ribi River
Bumpe River
Kagboro Creek
Sherbro River
Bagru River
Jong River (Taia River)
Pampana River
Teye River
Kittam River 
Sewa River
Bagbe River
Bafi River
Waanje River
Moa River
Meli River
Mano River
Mahoi River
Moro River

References
Rand McNally, The New International Atlas, 1993.
 GEOnet Names Server
United Nations, Department for Peacekeeping Operations Cartographic Section, 2004

Sierra Leone
Rivers